The Uqair Protocol or Uqair Convention was an agreement at Uqair on 2 December 1922 that defined the boundaries between Mandatory Iraq, the Sultanate of Nejd and Sheikhdom of Kuwait. It was imposed by Percy Cox, the British High Commissioner to Iraq, in response to Bedouin raiders from Nejd under Ibn Saud. Cox met ibn Saud and Major John More, the British Political Agent to Kuwait. The boundaries included a Saudi–Iraqi neutral zone and a Saudi–Kuwaiti neutral zone.

Kuwait was not permitted any role in outcome of the Uqair agreement when the Saudis and British decided Kuwait's modern boundaries. Kuwait lost more than two thirds of its territory as a result of the agreement, as well as its second largest town, the port of Manifa the loss of territory made anti-British sentiment grow in Kuwait.

See also

Iraq–Saudi Arabia border
Kuwait–Saudi Arabia border
List of Middle East peace proposals

References

External links
 Agreement concerning the boundary between Nejd and Kuwait United Nations Treaty Series, Vol 1750, Registration Number II-1083

History of Nejd
History of Kuwait
1922 in Kuwait
1922 in Iraq
1922 in Saudi Arabia
Middle East peace efforts
Iraq–United Kingdom relations
Kuwait–Saudi Arabia border
Iraq–Saudi Arabia border
Boundary treaties
Treaties of Kuwait
Treaties of the Sultanate of Nejd
Treaties concluded in 1922
Treaties entered into force in 1922
Treaties of Mandatory Iraq
December 1922 events